Alveda Celeste King (born January 22, 1951) is an American activist, author, and former state representative for the 28th District in the Georgia House of Representatives.

She is a niece of civil rights leader Martin Luther King Jr. and daughter of civil rights activist A. D. King and his wife, Naomi Barber King. She is a Fox News Channel contributor. She once served as a senior fellow at the Alexis de Tocqueville Institution, a conservative Washington, D.C., think tank. She is a former member of the Georgia House of Representatives and the founder of Alveda King Ministries.

Childhood and family
Alveda King was born in Atlanta, Georgia. She was the first of five children of A. D. King, the younger brother of Martin Luther King Jr., and his wife Naomi (Barber) King. King says her mother wanted to abort her so she could continue college, but her grandfather was able to persuade her to keep her child. When she was 12, her father became a leader of the Birmingham campaign while serving as pastor at the First Baptist Church of Ensley in Ensley near Birmingham, Alabama. Later that same year, King's house was bombed by opponents to the civil rights movement.

In 1969 her father, A. D. King, was found dead in the pool at his home. The cause of death was listed as an accidental drowning.

Martin Luther King Sr. wrote in his autobiography, "Alveda had been up the night before, she said, talking with her father and watching a television movie with him. He'd seemed unusually quiet . . . and not very interested in the film. But he had wanted to stay up and Alveda left him sitting in an easy chair, staring at the TV, when she went off to bed. . . . I had questions about A. D.'s death, and I still have them now. He was a good swimmer. Why did he drown? I don't know—I don't know that we will ever know what happened."

Education
King studied journalism and sociology as an undergraduate and received a Master of Arts degree in business management from Central Michigan University. She received an honorary doctorate from Saint Anselm College and a Doctor of Philosophy in Applied Theology from Aidan University.

Public office
From 1979 to 1982, King represented the 28th District in the Georgia House of Representatives. The district included Fulton County, and King served as a Democrat.

In 1984 King ran for the seat of Georgia's 5th congressional district in the U.S. House of Representatives. King challenged incumbent Representative Wyche Fowler. Fowler's predecessor, Andrew Young, endorsed Hosea Williams, who also challenged Fowler in the primary; Williams was one of Martin Luther King Jr.'s most trusted lieutenants and perhaps best known for organizing and leading the first Selma March.

Coretta Scott King did not endorse her niece. Young, who had given up the seat to serve as U.S. ambassador to the UN, and Williams approached King and asked her to end her campaign for the seat so that she could dedicate more time to her family. Young later apologized for what he called "some blatantly chauvinistic remarks." She did not withdraw. With the Black vote split, Fowler defeated both King and Williams in the primary. It was the last time she ran for elected office. Since then, she has publicly stated "I've been a Democrat, and I've been a Republican. I've even considered being an independent. Today, I'm just a Christian."

King is a member of the Frederick Douglass Bicentennial Commission, having been nominated to the position by President Donald Trump in 2018.

Presidential politics

In 1984, King supported the Reverend Jesse Jackson for president.

In 2012, King was a supporter of Herman Cain for president and defended him from sexual harassment claims, saying, "A woman knows a skirt-chaser" and "Mr. Cain does not chase skirts." She co-founded Women for Cain.

King voted for Donald Trump in the 2016 presidential election, stating, "I pray that all polar opposites learn to Agape Love, live, and work together as brothers and sisters—or perish as fools. While I voted for Mr. Trump, my confidence remains in God, for life, liberty, and the pursuit of happiness. Prayers for president-elect Trump, Congressman John Lewis, and everyone including leaders."

For the 2020 presidential election, King was an advisory board member of Black Voices for Trump.

Views and activism

Angela D. Dillard classifies King as among the most prominent black figures on the American religious right.

Anti-abortion activism
King is an anti-abortion activist. She had two abortions before changing her views following the birth of one of her children and her becoming a born-again Christian in 1983. King frames the issue as one of racial discrimination; she has referred to abortion as "womb-lynching" and accused Planned Parenthood of profiting from "aborting black babies." King is director of the activist group Civil Rights for the Unborn and is director of Priests for Life's African American outreach.

In 1996, she denounced her aunt Coretta Scott King for her support for abortion rights.

On September 22, 2020, King appeared in Birmingham alongside political activists including Amie Beth Dickinson to present the Equality Proclamation. The document, signed on the 158th anniversary of the Emancipation Proclamation's signing, argued that the tactics and locations of abortion providers like Planned Parenthood were racially discriminatory. According to a document distributed by the group, King and the other signees believed that “the targeted practices of Alabama abortion providers are both discriminatory and disproportionately harmful to black mothers and their babies” and that a legal case could be made against abortion using the Tenth Amendment.

2010 "Restoring Honor" rally
King spoke at Glenn Beck's Restoring Honor rally at the Lincoln Memorial in August 2010. ABC News reported that in King's speech, she hoped that "white privilege will become human privilege and that America will soon repent of the sin of racism and return itself to honor."

Opposition to same-sex marriage
King has spoken out against same-sex marriage. In 2010 she equated same-sex marriage to genocide at a rally in Atlanta, saying, "We don't want genocide. We don't want to destroy the sacred institution of marriage." In a 2015 essay, she wrote that "life is a human and civil right, so is procreative marriage. . . . We must now go back to the beginning, starting with Genesis, and teach about God's plan for marriage."

Personal life
King is African-American. She has been married and divorced three times. Her first marriage was to Eddie Clifford Beal, her second marriage was to Jerry Ellis, and her third marriage was to Israel Tookes. She has six children.

King has alleged that her novel, The Arab Heart, was plagiarized in the 1988 film Coming to America.

Works
King has written the following books:
 For generations to come: Poetry by Alveda King Beal (as Alveda King Beal) (1986)
 The Arab Heart (as Alveda King Beal) (1986)
 I Don't Want Your Man, I Want My Own (2001)
 Sons of Thunder: The King Family Legacy (2003)
 Who We Are In Christ Jesus (2008)
 How Can the Dream Survive If We Murder the Children?: Abortion is Not a Civil Right! (2008)
 King Rules: Ten Truths for You, Your Family, and Our Nation to Prosper (2014)
 King Truths: 21 Keys To Unlocking Your Spiritual Potential (2018)
 Why Trump? Memoirs of a Journey of Faith, Hope and Love (2020)
 We're Not Color Blind: Healing the Racial Divide (2020) (co-author Ginger Howard)
King produced the musical CD Let Freedom Ring in 2005. She has appeared in film and television as both Alveda King and Alveda King Beal. The Human Experience, a 2010 documentary film, featured commentary from King. She co-produced the video "Latter Rain" (2005) and co-executive-produced Pray for America (2015).

King portrayed Gaylee's mother in "Fifteen Forever" season 2, episode 19 of "In the Heat of the Night", original air date April 25, 1989.

See also
 Christine King Farris
 List of African-American Republicans
 Black conservatism in the United States

References

External links

 Alveda King Ministries
 African-American Outreach, Priests of Life
 
 

1951 births
Living people
20th-century American politicians
20th-century Baptists
20th-century American women politicians
21st-century American non-fiction writers
21st-century Baptists
Activists for African-American civil rights
African-American Christians
African-American state legislators in Georgia (U.S. state)
African-American women in politics
African-American writers
American Christian writers
American evangelists
Women evangelists
American anti-abortion activists
Baptist writers
Baptists from Georgia (U.S. state)
Central Michigan University alumni
Critics of Black Lives Matter
Georgia (U.S. state) Democrats
Georgia (U.S. state) Republicans
Alveda 
Members of the Georgia House of Representatives
Politicians from Atlanta
Women state legislators in Georgia (U.S. state)
American women non-fiction writers
Activists from Georgia (U.S. state)
21st-century American women writers